KXFX-CD, virtual channel 67 (UHF digital channel 20), is a low-power, Class A television station licensed to Brownsville, Texas, United States. It is a translator of Harlingen-licensed Fox affiliate KFXV (channel 38) which is owned by Santa Monica, California–based Entravision Communications. KXFX-CD's transmitter is located on McAllen Road in Brownsville; its parent station shares studios with duopoly partner and Univision affiliate KNVO (channel 48) on Jackson Road in McAllen.

History
While affiliated with Telefutura, the programming of KXFX-CA (then known as KVTF-CA) was also seen in McAllen on KTFV-CA channel 32, in La Feria on KCWT-CA channel 30, and on the digital signal of KNVO channel 48.2 / 49.2. KTFV and the KNVO subchannel continue to carry what is now UniMás, while KCWT is now a CW affiliate.

Technical information

Subchannels

KXFX-CD and KMBH-LD operate on the same physical channel and carry the same programming.

References

Fox network affiliates
Low-power television stations in the United States
Television stations in the Lower Rio Grande Valley
Television channels and stations established in 1997
1997 establishments in Texas
Entravision Communications stations